The Department of the East was a military administrative district established by the U.S. Army several times in its history.  The first was from 1853 to 1861, the second Department of the East, from 1863 to 1873, and the last from 1877 to 1913.

History
As part of a major reorganization of the Western Territories, after October 31, 1853 the division echelon was eliminated and the six western departments consolidated into four (Departments of Texas, New Mexico, the West, and the Pacific).  The four departments (1st-4th) of the Eastern Division were similarly consolidated into the  Department of the East, with boundaries encompassing all the states east of the Mississippi River.  It remained thus until August 17, 1861, when the American Civil War, created a need for a vast increase in the Union Army and more departments to administer them and the Department of the East was discontinued. 

On January 3, 1863, the Department of the East was revived, to administer the many districts and posts created by the Civil War in New York, New Jersey and the states of New England.  It became subordinate to the Military Division of the Atlantic, from 1865 to 1866 and the Division of the Atlantic, in 1868 until this department was discontinued in 1873. 
 
Again the Department of the East was revived in 1877, once again subordinate to the Division of the Atlantic, until the Division was discontinued in 1891.  In 1911, it became subordinate to a new Eastern Division, until the Department of the East was discontinued 1913, being replaced by the Eastern Department. The Panama Canal Department was created as a separate formation on 26 June 1917 by separation from the Eastern Department. 

The 24th Aero Squadron returned to the United States on or about 1 August 1919 and reported to Mitchell Field, on Long Island, New York. However, the squadron was sent to Park Field, near Memphis, Tennessee, where personnel were de-mobilized and returned to civilian life. It was carried as an administrative unit seemingly under the Eastern Department, however, it was not re-manned and was finally inactivated on 1 October 1919.

The Eastern Department was discontinued when the Army's command was reorganized by the 1920 amendment to the 1916 Defense Act. It was replaced by the Second Corps Area.

Headquarters
The headquarters of the 1853–1861 Department of the East in 1861 was Troy, New York, except for the few years under the command of Gen. Bankhead, when he made his headquarters at Fort McHenry, in Baltimore, Maryland.

The headquarters of the last Department of the East was originally located in leased office space in New York City until 1878, when the War Department relocated all headquarters functions across the country to army posts due to economic considerations. The headquarters was relocated to Fort Columbus, renamed Fort Jay in 1904 on Governors Island in New York Harbor.

1853–1861 Department of the East commanders
 Major. Gen. John E. Wool 1853–1854
 Bvt. Brig. Gen. James Bankhead 1854–1856
 Major. Gen. John E. Wool 1857 – Aug 17, 1861

1863–1873 Department of the East commanders
 Major. Gen. John E. Wool January 3, 1863 – July 18, 1863
 Major. Gen. John A. Dix, July 18, 1863 – June 27, 1865
 Major. Gen. Joseph Hooker June 27, 1865 – August, 1866
 Major. Gen. George Gordon Meade, August, 1866 – January 2, 1868
 Major. Gen. Thomas W. Sherman January 2, 1868 – July 16, 1868
 Major. Gen. Irvin McDowell July 16, 1868 – December 16, 1872

1877–1913 Department of the East commanders
In 1878, the War Department directed that all departmental commands, if not located on a post, were to give up leased office space and off-post housing allowances and relocate headquarters and staff to the nearest Army post. In New York City, the headquarters was moved to Fort Columbus on Governors Island in New York Harbor.

 1878 Winfield S. Hancock 
 1886 John M. Schofield 
 1888 Oliver O. Howard 
 1891 John M. Schofield 
 1891 Oliver O. Howard 
 1894 Nelson A. Miles 
 1895 Thomas H. Ruger 
 1897 Wesley Merritt 
 1898 20 May to 2 July Royal Thaxter Frank 
 1898 2 July to 24 October George L. Gillespie 
 1898 William R. Shafter 
 1899 Wesley Merritt 
 1900 John R. Brooke 
 1902 Arthur MacArthur 
 1902 Adna R. Chaffee 
 1903 Henry C. Corbin 
 1904 Frederick D. Grant 
 1904 James F. Wade 
 1907 Frederick D. Grant 
 1908 Leonard Wood 
 1910 Frederick D. Grant 
 1912 Tasker H. Bliss 
 1912 Thomas H. Barry

1913–1920 Eastern Department commanders
 1913 Thomas H. Barry 
 1914 Robert K. Evans 
 1914 Leonard Wood 
 1917 J. Franklin Bell 
 1917 Eli D. Hoyle 
 1918 William A. Mann 
 1918 J. Franklin Bell
 1919 Thomas H. Barry
 1919 Charles Justin Bailey

References

 US Army Order of Battle, 1919–1941(chapter 2)
  National Archives, Guide to Federal Records; Records of United States Army Continental Commands, 1821-1920 (Record Group 393), 1817-1940 (bulk 1817-1920)

East
East
Government agencies established in 1853
Government agencies established in 1863
Government agencies established in 1877
1853 establishments in the United States